Heidemarie "Heidi" Reineck (born 15 February 1952) is a German former swimmer who won three bronze medals in relay events at the 1968 and 1972 Summer Olympics. Individually she finished fifth in the 100 m freestyle in 1972. She also won bronze medals in relay events at the 1970 European Aquatics Championships and 1973 World Aquatics Championships.

Nationally, she won seven titles in the 100 m (1968–1971), 200 m (1968, 1970) and 400 m (1968) freestyle events.

References

1952 births
Living people
German female swimmers
German female freestyle swimmers
Olympic swimmers of West Germany
Swimmers at the 1968 Summer Olympics
Swimmers at the 1972 Summer Olympics
Olympic bronze medalists for West Germany
Olympic bronze medalists in swimming
World Aquatics Championships medalists in swimming
European Aquatics Championships medalists in swimming
Swimmers from Berlin
Medalists at the 1972 Summer Olympics
Medalists at the 1968 Summer Olympics
Universiade medalists in swimming
Universiade bronze medalists for West Germany
20th-century German women
21st-century German women